Grigory Naumovich Aronshtam (1893 – 1938) served as the fourth first secretary of the Communist Party of the Turkmen SSR, serving from 11 May 1928 until August 1930. In addition, he was the third and final person to hold the position of president of the Turkmen SSR before its responsibilities were merged with those of the first secretary. He was the brother of Lazar Aronshtam, and like his brother, was executed during the Great Purge.

He was succeeded as first secretary by Yakov Popok.

References 
World Statesmen
Rulers of Soviet Republics

1893 births
1938 deaths
People from Borzna
People from Borznyansky Uyezd
Party leaders of the Soviet Union
Communist Party of Turkmenistan politicians
Jews from the Russian Empire
Ukrainian Jews
Soviet Jews
Great Purge victims from Ukraine
People executed by the Soviet Union by firearm
Jews executed by the Soviet Union
Jewish Ukrainian politicians
Jewish socialists